Joaquín Calderón Vicente (born 10 October 1988) is a Spanish footballer who plays for Crevillente Deportivo as a right winger.

Club career
Calderón was born in Elche, Valencian Community. He all but spent his extensive career in the lower leagues.

From 2006 to 2008, Calderón played in the Segunda División with local club Elche CF after graduating from its youth system. He scored his only goal in the competition on 9 June 2007, in the last minute of a 1–0 home victory against CD Castellón.

References

External links

1988 births
Living people
Spanish footballers
Footballers from Elche
Association football wingers
Segunda División players
Segunda División B players
Tercera División players
Divisiones Regionales de Fútbol players
Elche CF Ilicitano footballers
Elche CF players
Valencia CF Mestalla footballers
Deportivo Alavés players
CA Osasuna B players
Gimnàstic de Tarragona footballers
Cádiz CF players
CD Alcoyano footballers
UE Sant Andreu footballers
CF Badalona players
Novelda CF players
CD Torrevieja players
Crevillente Deportivo players
Spain youth international footballers